John Filip von Schantz (17 January 1835 in Ulvila — 24 July 1865 in Helsinki), was a Finnish composer and musician. He left Helsinki in 1855 after being expelled from University of Helsinki, deciding to devote himself to music. The following year he began studies in violin and composition in Stockholm and continued them at Leipzig in Germany in 1857–1860.

In 1860 he was employed as conductor at the Swedish Theatre in Helsinki. When the Swedish Theatre burned down in 1863 he began performing at Berns Salonger in Stockholm, Sweden.

References

External links
Schantz, 4. John von Filip of Nordisk familjebok (Edition 2, 1916).

1835 births
1865 deaths
Finnish composers
Finnish male composers
Finnish conductors (music)
19th-century composers
19th-century conductors (music)